Gary Stuart Boyd (born 4 October 1986) is an English professional golfer who currently plays on the Challenge Tour.

Boyd was born in Banbury, England and attended Chenderit School in Middleton Cheney. He turned professional in 2007.

Boyd had a strong start to the 2009 Challenge Tour season, recording his first win at the Tusker Kenya Open. He followed that by finishing as runner-up to Edoardo Molinari at the Piemonte Open, to lead the Challenge Tour Rankings at the end of May.

He had a good first season on the European Tour in 2010, the highlight being a runner-up finish at the Czech Open and he finished 50th on the Order of Merit. However after a poor 2012 season he lost his full playing rights on tour.

In 2015 he played on the Challenge Tour, initially on invitations, and finished seventh to earn a return to the European Tour.

Amateur wins (1)
2006 Asia Pacific Amateur Championship

Professional wins (1)

Challenge Tour wins (1)

Challenge Tour playoff record (0–2)

Playoff record
European Tour playoff record (0–1)

Results in major championships

CUT = missed the half-way cut
"T" = tied

Team appearances
Amateur
Jacques Léglise Trophy (representing Great Britain and Ireland): 2004 (winners)
European Youths' Team Championship (representing England): 2006
European Amateur Team Championship (representing England): 2007

See also
2009 Challenge Tour graduates
2015 Challenge Tour graduates

External links

English male golfers
European Tour golfers
Sportspeople from Banbury
People from Middleton Cheney
1986 births
Living people